The NS 7000 was a series of tank engines of the Dutch Railways (NS) and its predecessors Maatschappij tot Exploitatie van Staatsspoorwegen (SS) and Nederlandsche Centraal-Spoorweg-Maatschappij (NCS).

History 
In 1899, the NCS bought a tank engine from the Sächsische Machinenfabrik in Chemnitz for use on the local railway lines. Inspiration was taken from the 2.311 to 2.380 series of the French Compagnie des chemins de fer du Nord. After the locomotive entered service and proven itself with the NCS, a follow-up order was placed for four more locomotives, which were put into service in 1901 as 42–45. No. 41 was delivered in the original green NCS livery, but Nos. 42-45 were painted in the new ocher yellow livery introduced in 1901 with olive green bands with white and red piping. In 1901 all five locomotives 41-45 were sold to the Nederlandsche Buurtspoorweg-Maatschappij (NBM).

In 1902, a batch of three locomotives (Nos. 46-48) was delivered with another batch of two locomotives (Nos. 49–50) arriving the following year, these being built by Hohenzollern in Düsseldorf-Grafenberg.

Modifications 
All ten locomotives were built without a superheater. In 1909, Nos. 42 and 48 were fitted with a smokebox superheater, after favorable results had been obtained with express locomotives Nos. 19 and 21. After the superheater also produced favorable results with Nos. 42 and 48, Nos. 43, 47 and 50 were also fitted in 1910 and 1911. The superheater of No. 48 was removed in 1912 and received a fully occupied superheater. No. 41 received a flame tube superheater from Werkspoor in Amsterdam in 1914. In 1916 the NCS bought back the five locomotives sold to the NBM.

In 1919, the NCS was taken over by the SS, with these locomotives being included in the SS numbering as Nos. 151–160. When the locomotive and rolling stock fleets of the HSM and the SS was merged in 1921, the locomotives of this series were given the NS numbers 7001–7010. The NS continued the fitting of superheaters, so that eventually all locomotives of this series were equipped with a superheater. Other changes carried out by the NS involved the installation of a sandbox on the boiler around 1924 and the removal of the bell after 1938.

In and After NS service 
The NS used these locomotives, among other routes, on the Haarlemmermeer lines, to replace the series 7700.

From 1954 onwards, No. 7001 was used by the NS on the NTM line between Groningen and Drachten. No. 7001 was the last former NCS locomotive to be withdrawn in 1954, after which the locomotive served for several months as a static boiler for the Wilco factory in Assen. In 1955 the engine was scrapped in Veenendaal, after 55 years of service and 2.2 million kilometers traveled.

NS 7009 was sold to the Kempensche Zinc company in Budel in 1951. The locomotive remained there under its NS number until 1967, when it was sold for scrap.

Gallery

Sources 

 A. Weijts: Tussen vuur en stoom. Uitg. Europese Bibliotheek, Zaltbommel, 2001. .

Rolling stock of the Netherlands
Steam locomotives of the Netherlands
4-4-0T locomotives
Hohenzollern locomotives
Sächsische Maschinenfabrik locomotives
Nederlandsche Centraal-Spoorweg-Maatschappij